Clayton Davis Andrews (born January 4, 1997) is an American professional baseball pitcher in the Milwaukee Brewers organization.

Amateur career
Andrews attended Maria Carrillo High School. He was drafted by the Los Angeles Dodgers in the 40th round of the 2017 Major League Baseball (MLB) draft out of Cabrillo College. He did not sign and played college baseball at California State University, Long Beach, where he was a two-way player.

Professional career
The Milwaukee Brewers selected Andrews in the 17th round of the 2018 MLB draft, and he signed. Andrews spent his first professional season with the Helena Brewers and Wisconsin Timber Rattlers.

In 2019, Andrews played with the Carolina Mudcats and Biloxi Shuckers, going 5–2 with 11 saves and a 3.19 ERA, and 77 strikeouts in 59.1 innings.

After the season, he played in the Arizona Fall League. And also, on October 10, 2019, he was selected for the United States national baseball team in the 2019 WBSC Premier 12.

References

External links

1997 births
Living people
Baseball pitchers
Baseball players from California
Biloxi Shuckers players
Carolina Mudcats players
Glendale Desert Dogs players
Helena Brewers players
Long Beach State Dirtbags baseball players
People from Petaluma, California
United States national baseball team players
Wisconsin Timber Rattlers players
2019 WBSC Premier12 players
Nashville Sounds players